The Men's Individual Open was an archery competition in the 1992 Summer Paralympics.

Gold medalist, Jens Fudge, was the second Danish male archer to win a medal in the Paralympics, after Finn Larsen who won gold in 1980, as he defeated Japanese Kenichi Nishii in the final. The bronze medal match was won by Korean Hyun Kwan Cho.

Results

Qualifying round

Finals

References

Men's individual open